This article provides a timeline of the Cassini–Huygens mission (commonly called Cassini). Cassini was a collaboration between the United States' NASA, the European Space Agency ("ESA"), and the Italian Space Agency ("ASI") to send a probe to study the Saturnian system, including the planet, its rings, and its natural satellites. The Flagship-class uncrewed robotic spacecraft comprised both NASA's Cassini probe, and ESA's Huygens lander which was designed to land on Saturn's largest moon, Titan. Cassini was the fourth space probe to visit Saturn and the first to enter its orbit. The craft were named after astronomers Giovanni Cassini and Christiaan Huygens.

Launched aboard a Titan IVB/Centaur on 15 October 1997, Cassini had a nearly 20-year life span, with 13 of these years spent orbiting Saturn. The voyage to Saturn included flybys of Venus (April 1998 and June 1999), Earth (August 1999), the asteroid 2685 Masursky, and Jupiter (December 2000). The probes entered orbit on 1 July 2004, and the mission ended on 15 September 2017, when Cassini flew into Saturn's upper atmosphere in order to prevent any risk of contaminating Saturn's moons, some of which have active environments that could potentially bear life. The mission is widely perceived to have succeeded beyond expectations. Cassini-Huygens has been described by NASA's Planetary Science Division Director as a "mission of firsts", that has revolutionized human understanding of the Saturnian system, including its moons and rings, and our understanding of where life might be found in the Solar System. 

Cassinis primary mission lasted for four years, from June 2004 to May 2008. The mission was extended for another two years until September 2010, under the name of Cassini Equinox Mission. The mission was extended a second and final time with the Cassini Solstice Mission, lasting until the spacecraft's destruction in September 2017.

The Huygens module traveled with Cassini until its separation from the probe on 25 December 2004; it was successfully landed by parachute on Titan on 14 January 2005. It successfully returned data to Earth for around 90 minutes, using the orbiter as a relay. This was the first landing ever accomplished in the outer Solar System and the first landing on a moon other than our own. 

At the end of its mission, the Cassini spacecraft executed the "Grand Finale" of its mission: several risky passes through the gaps between Saturn and Saturn's inner rings. The purpose of this phase was to maximize Cassini scientific outcome before the spacecraft was destroyed. The atmospheric entry of Cassini effectively ended the mission, although data analysis and production is still ongoing.

Launch and cruise phase (1997–2003)

15 October 1997 01:43 Pacific Daylight Time (PDT)  – Cassini launched at 08:43 UTC inside Titan IVB/Centaur rocket at Cape Canaveral.

26 April 1998 06:52 PDT – Gravity-assisted flyby of Venus at 284 km, receiving a boost in speed of about 7 kilometers per second.

3 December 1998 22:06 PST – Cassini fired its main rocket engine for 90 minutes, setting the spacecraft on course for its second Venus flyby in 1999. The engine burn slowed the spacecraft by close to 450 meters per second (about 1,006 miles per hour) relative to the Sun. Cassinis speed went from 67,860 kilometers per hour (42,168 miles per hour) at the start of the maneuver to 66,240 kilometers per hour (41,161 miles per hour) at the end of the engine firing. 

24 June 1999 13:30 PDT – Gravity-assisted flyby of Venus at 623 km.

18 August 1999 03:28 UTC − Gravity-assisted flyby of Earth. An hour 20 minutes before closest approach, Cassini made the closest approach to the Moon at 377,000 km, and took a series of calibration images.
Cassini received a 5.5-kilometer-per-second (about 12,000-mile-per-hour) boost in velocity.

23 January 2000 – flyby of Asteroid 2685 Masursky around 10:00 UTC. Cassini took images 5 to 7 hours before at 1.6 million km distance and estimated a diameter of 15 to 20 km.

30 December 2000 10:05 UTC − Gravity-assisted flyby of Jupiter. Cassini was at its closest point (9.7 million kilometres, 137 Jovian radii) to Jupiter at this date, and performed many scientific measurements.

30 May 2001 – During the coast phase between Jupiter and Saturn, it was noticed that "haze" became visible in the pictures taken by the narrow-angle camera of Cassini. This was first seen when a picture of the star Maia in the Pleiades was taken after a routine heating period.

23 July 2002 – In late January, a test was performed to remove the "haze" from the narrow-angle camera lens by heating it. Warming the camera to 4 degrees Celsius (39 degrees Fahrenheit) for eight days produced positive results. Later, the heating was extended to 60 days, and a picture of the star Spica showed an improvement of more than 90 percent compared to before the heating period. On 9 July, a picture showed that the removal procedure was completed successfully, which was announced on 23 July.

10 October 2003 – The Cassini science team announced the results of a test of Einstein's theory of gravity, using radio signals from the Cassini probe. The researchers observed a frequency shift in the radio waves to and from the space craft, as those signals traveled close to the Sun. Past tests were in agreement with the theoretical predictions with an accuracy of one part in one thousand. The Cassini experiment improved this to about 20 parts in a million, with the data still supporting Einstein's theory.

Primary mission (2004–2008)

27 February 2004 – A new, high-resolution picture of Saturn taken by Cassini on 9 February was released, and it was noted that mission scientists were puzzled by the fact that no "spokes" in Saturn's ring are visible. These dark structures in the "B" section of the ring had been discovered in pictures taken by the Voyager probe in 1981. Another picture, in infrared light, taken on 16 February shows cloud height differences and the same disturbance visible throughout the 1990s in Hubble Space Telescope images.

12 March 2004 – Pictures taken on 23 February do show a feature discovered by Voyager: Clumps in the outer "F"-ring. What could not be ascertained at the time was the exact lifetime of these clumps, and it is hoped that Cassini will provide conclusive data about this question. The first set of pictures shows a set of "clumps" moving along the "F" ring.

26 March 2004 – The Cassini science team published the first sequence of pictures of Saturn showing clouds moving at high speed around the planet. Using a filter to better see water haze on top of the dense cloud cover, motions in the equatorial and southern regions are clearly visible. The pictures were taken during the days from 15 to 19 February.

8 April 2004 – The first "long-term" observation of cloud dynamics in Saturn's atmosphere were published by mission scientists. A set of pictures shows two storms in the southern latitudes merge during a period from 19 to 20 March. Both storms had a diameter of about  before they merged.

15 April 2004 – NASA announced that two moons discovered by Voyager 1 were sighted again by Cassini in pictures taken on 10 March: Prometheus and Pandora. These are no ordinary moons, but their gravitational effects on the "F" ring led scientists to call them "shepherd moons". They fascinate all researchers interested in the dynamics of the ring system, because their orbits are close enough that they interact with each other in a chaotic manner. They have a history of defying predictions of their orbits. One of Cassini's missions will be to monitor the movements of these bodies closely.

18 May 2004 – Cassini entered the Saturn system. The gravitational pull of Saturn began to overtake the influence of the Sun.

20 May 2004 – The first picture of Titan with better resolution than any Earth-based observation was released. It was taken 5 May from a distance of 29.3 million kilometers (18.2 million miles).

27 May 2004 – TCM-20, the Phoebe approach TCM (Trajectory Correction Maneuver) was executed at 22:26:00 UTC. This was a 5-minute and 56 second burn of the main engine, which was not used since December 1998. It therefore doubled as a "dress rehearsal" for the 96 minute burn during "Saturn Orbit Insertion" (SOI). However, TCM-20 was mainly designed to change Cassini's velocity by 34.7 m/s (78 mph), setting up a flyby of the moon Phoebe 11 June.

11 June 2004 – Cassini flew by the moon Phoebe at 19:33 UT in Spacecraft Event Time at 2068 kilometers distance. All of the eleven onboard instruments operated as expected and all data was acquired. Scientists plan to use the data to create global maps of the cratered moon, and to determine Phoebe's composition, mass and density. It took scientists several days to pore over the data to make more concrete conclusions.

16 June 2004 – TCM-21 took place with a 38-second main engine burn. It was planned as the last correction of the trajectory of Cassini before SOI. A few days later the final TCM-22 tentatively scheduled for 21 June was canceled.

1 July 2004 – The Saturn Orbit Insertion burn was successfully executed. At 7:11 p.m. PDT (10:11 p.m. EDT), Cassini crossed the ring plane between Saturn's F and G rings. Its antenna was oriented forward acting as a shield against small ring particles. At 7:36 p.m. PDT (10:36 p.m. EDT), the spacecraft began a critical 96-minute main engine burn to cut its velocity by 626 meters per second and permit a 0.02 x 9 million kilometer Saturn orbit. Right after that burn, pictures of the rings were taken and sent back to mission scientist as the spacecraft approached within 19,980 kilometers (12,400 miles) from the cloud tops. Scientists were surprised by the clarity and detail of the pictures and will be poring over them for quite some time. "We won't see the whole puzzle, only pieces, but what we are seeing is dramatic," said Dr. Carolyn Porco, Cassini imaging team leader, Space Science Institute, Boulder, Colo. "The images are mind-boggling, just mind-boggling. I've been working on this mission for 14 years and I shouldn't be surprised, but it is remarkable how startling it is to see these images for the first time."

2 July 2004 – Cassinis first flyby of Titan was executed and first close up pictures were sent back to Earth. Due to the planning of the initial orbit, Cassini was passing over the south pole of the moon and from a larger distance than in later flybys. However, during a press conference on 3 June, mission scientist presented pictures that are already forcing them to rethink previous theories. It now seems that the darker and brighter albedo features on the surface do represent different materials. But in contrast to expectation, the icy regions seem to be darker than the areas where other (possibly organic) matter is mixed in with the ice.

16 August 2004 – Mission scientists announce the discovery of two new moons of Saturn, and with it the successful start of one of the programs of Cassini: Locating small and yet unknown moons. Later named "Methone" (S/2004 S 1) and "Pallene" (S/2004 S 2), these objects are small compared to other moons and they orbit between Mimas and Enceladus.

23 August 2004 – At a distance of 9 million kilometers from Saturn, the last major firing of the main engine took place to adjust the next closest approach and avoid the particles in the ring system. The 51 minute burn increased the velocity of the probe by 325 meters per second, moving the orbital periapsis point about 300,000 km farther away from Saturn than its smallest distance during SOI. At the same time, the new course will bring Cassini very close to Titan on its next flyby.

14 September 2004 – Final checkout of the Huygens lander was completed successfully. The separation of the probe stays scheduled for 25 December, with the landing anticipated on 14 January 2005.

26 October 2004 – The second flyby of Titan (called "Titan-A") was successfully executed. Data started to arrive at the JPL mission center at 01:30 UTC, 27 October, and included the highest resolution pictures ever taken of the surface of that moon. Also, first high-resolution infra-red spectra and pictures were taken from the atmosphere and surface. The spacecraft successfully skimmed the hazy, smoggy atmosphere of Titan, coming within 1,176 kilometers of Titan's surface. The flyby was the closest that any spacecraft has ever come to Titan. The pictures, spectra, and radar data revealed a complex, puzzling surface. Analysis of all data is on-going. The only glitch during the "Titan-A" event involved the CIRS instrument. During playback, the instrument team observed corrupted data. A decision was made to power the instrument off to reboot it. CIRS was powered back on within 24 hours and is currently in its nominal state.

23 November 2004 – The last in-flight checkout of the Huygens probe before separation was completed successfully. All systems are ready for an on-time deployment of the probe.

13 December 2004 – The "Titan-B" flyby was executed successfully and the collected data are analyzed by mission scientists.

25 December 2004 – Huygens probe separated from Cassini orbiter at 02:00 UTC.

27 December – NASA published a picture of Huygens taken from Cassini two days after release. It reported that the analysis of that picture shows that the probe is on the correct course within the expected error range. These checks were necessary in order to place the orbiter in the correct orientation to receive the data from the probe when it enters Titan's atmosphere.

28 December 2004 – OTM-10 was executed at 03:00 UTC in Spacecraft Event Time. This maneuver, also called the Orbit Deflection Maneuver (ODM), took Cassini off of a Titan-impacting trajectory and on to a flyby trajectory with the required altitude to receive data from the Huygens probe as it plunges into Titan.

31 December 2004 – Cassinis flyby of Iapetus occurred at 18:45:37 UTC at an altitude of 122645 kilometers. First raw pictures were available the next day.

14 January 2005 – Huygens entered Titan's atmosphere at 09:06 UTC and had landed softly on its surface about two hours later. This was confirmed by the reception of the carrier wave emitted by the probe during its descent and touchdown. At 16:19 UTC the Cassini orbiter started to relay to Earth the scientific data received from the probe. The first picture was released at 19:45 UTC, showing a view from about 16 km above the surface. A second picture taken from the probe at rest on the surface was released a short time later. Analysis of the data is ongoing.

15 February 2005 – Successful Titan flyby, with new regions of its surface scanned by radar.

17 February 2005 – The first close flyby of Enceladus was executed and first closeup images were sent back to Earth.

17 March 2005 – The Cassini probe reveals that Saturn's moon Enceladus has an atmosphere. It has been described as "substantial" by its discoverers.

16 April 2005 – The fifth planned flyby of Titan with a minimum distance of about 1,025 kilometers was executed at 19:12 UTC. This was the closest flyby up to this date, and provided the opportunity to obtain more detailed data on the constituents in the upper atmosphere of Titan. The first analysis of that data showed a large range of complex carbon molecules. On 25 April a mass plot was published that demonstrates the existence of these molecules.

3 May 2005 – Cassini begins Radio occultation experiments on Saturn's Rings, to determine ring particle size distribution, on the scale of centimetres.

10 May 2005 – At the beginning of a period of focussed observation of the ring system of Saturn, slated to take until September, mission scientists announced the discovery of a new moon in the "Keeler gap" inside the "A" ring. Provisionally named S/2005 S 1 and later named Daphnis, it was first seen in a time-lapse sequence of images taken on 1 May. Imaging scientists had predicted the new moon's presence and its orbital distance from Saturn after last July's sighting of a set of peculiar spiky and wispy features in the Keeler gap's outer edge.

First raw pictures were published.

27 July 2006 – NASA confirms the presence of hydrocarbon lakes in Titan's northern polar region.

28 May 2008 – Cassini completed its 43rd flyby of Titan, ending its primary mission. Renamed Cassini Equinox mission, Cassini observed Saturn during its equinox crossing, or summertime.

Cassini Equinox mission (2008–2010)

9 August, 11 August, 9 October, and 31 October 2008 – With closest approach at 50, 25, and 200 km, respectively, Cassinis last three Enceladus flybys of 2008 utilized a new imaging technique named "skeet shooting" to successfully acquire very high resolution images. The flybys also allowed Cassini to directly sample Enceladus's cryovolcanic plumes.

3 November, 14 November, 5 December, and 21 December 2009 – Titan flybys 46 through 49 concentrated on radar, VIMS, and INMS sampling of Titan and its thick atmosphere. T47 involved high-resolution VIMS coverage of the Huygens landing site, while the other three flybys made use of radar and RSS. T49 allowed radar coverage of Ontario Lacus, one of the largest methane lakes on Titan.

June - October 2009 – Cassini observed Saturn during its equinox, or the time of Saturn's year where the sun is directly over its equator.

2 November 2010 – Cassini was triggered into a protective standby mode, or "safe mode", after a bit flip caused it to miss an important instruction. NASA announced the interruption in scientific processes on 8 November. However, by 8 November some of the craft's functionality had already been partly restored. Nominal scientific instrument sequencing events were successfully started on 10 November. Cassini was reactivated as scheduled on 24 November and has returned to perfect working order, in time for two scheduled close fly-bys with Enceladus. At this point there has been no public disclosure as to the data loss impact of the 11 November (T-73) flyby. However, no images were acquired on the 11 November polar flyby.

Cassini Solstice Mission (2010–2017)
On 3 February 2010, NASA announced that a second mission extension until May 2017, a few months past Saturn's summer solstice, had been funded. The schedule included an additional 155 orbits, with 54 flybys of Titan, 11 of Enceladus, 2 of Rhea, and 3 of Dione. One of the flybys of Titan dipped below the ionosphere.

Grand Finale (2017)

On 15 September 2017, Cassini was deliberately disposed of by a controlled fall into Saturn's atmosphere, ending its nearly two-decade-long mission. The last signal was received at 11:55:46 UTC.

Cassini orbiter travel milestones

Detailed timeline of Huygens mission

All times given after 2005-Jan-14 09:11 UTC are expected event times and may differ from actual event times. This page will be updated after descent has occurred with corrections if they are necessary.

The data used in this section has been slightly out of date, an updated version of ephemeris from ESA was available 2005 January 6.

Timeline of Huygens landing process
{| class="wikitable"
|-
!  style="width:200px; text-align:center;"| Date (UTC)
!  style="width:400px; text-align:center;"| Description
|- style="vertical-align:top;"
|  style="text-align:center; " | 2004 December 25, 02:00
|  style="text-align:left; "| Huygens separates from Cassini. Its flight path initially takes it away from Titan.
|- style="vertical-align:top;"
|  style="text-align:center; " | 2005 January 03, 20:01
|  style="text-align:left; "| Huygens reaches a maximum distance of 4,658,661 kilometers from Titan.
|- style="vertical-align:top;"
|  style="text-align:center; " | 2005 January 11, 12:00
|  style="text-align:left; "| Cassini rise in the east (azimuth = 93 degrees) as seen from the landing site
|- style="vertical-align:top;"
|  style="text-align:center; " | 2005 January 12, 11:20
|  style="text-align:left; " |Huygens is 1,000,000 kilometers from Titan.
|- style="vertical-align:top;"
|  style="text-align:center; " | 2005 January 13, 09:21
|  style="text-align:left; "| Huygens is 500,000 kilometers from Titan.
|- style="vertical-align:top;"
|  style="text-align:center; " | 2005 January 14, 04:23
|  style="text-align:left; "| Huygens is 100,000 kilometers from Titan.
|- style="vertical-align:top;"
|  style="text-align:center; " | 2005 January 14, 06:50
|  style="text-align:left; " |Cassini turns on probe radio link receivers. Huygens is 50,000 km from Titan.
|- style="vertical-align:top;"
|  style="text-align:center; " | 2005 January 14, 07:02
|  style="text-align:left; " |Cassini begins to turn radio dish toward Titan
|- style="vertical-align:top;"
|  style="text-align:center; " | 2005 January 14, 07:14
|  style="text-align:left; " |Cassini turn to Titan complete; 3 minutes later orbiter X-band downlink disabled
|- style="vertical-align:top;"
|  style="text-align:center; "| 2005 January 14, 08:29
|  style="text-align:left; "| Saturn occulted by Titan as seen from Huygens
|- style="vertical-align:top;"
|  style="text-align:center; "| 2005 January 14, 08:38
|  style="text-align:left; "| Saturn's rings occulted by Titan as seen from Huygens
|- style="vertical-align:top;"
|  style="text-align:center; "| 2005 January 14, 08:44
|  style="text-align:left; "| Probe turns transmitters on; low power mode
|- style="vertical-align:top;"
|  style="text-align:center; " | 2005 January 14, 08:48
|  style="text-align:left; "| Huygens is 10,000 kilometers from Titan.
|- style="vertical-align:top;"
|  style="text-align:center; "| 2005 January 14, 09:06
|  style="text-align:left; "| Huygens enters the atmosphere of Titan
|- style="vertical-align:top;"
|  style="text-align:center; "| 2005 January 14, 09:09
|  style="text-align:left; "| Huygens feels maximum deceleration
|- style="vertical-align:top;"
|  style="text-align:center; "| 2005 January 14, 09:10
|  style="text-align:left; "|Huygens deploys its pilot chute, followed closely by the main chute.
|- style="vertical-align:top;"
|  style="text-align:center; " | 2005 January 14, 09:11
|  style="text-align:left; " |Huygens begins data transmission to Cassini.
|- style="vertical-align:top;"
|  style="text-align:center; " | 2005 January 14, 09:18
|  style="text-align:left; " | Release front shield; transmitters switch to high power mode; instruments configured for descent and measurements commence
|- style="vertical-align:top;"
|  style="text-align:center; "| 2005 January 14, 09:25
|  style="text-align:left; "| Main parachute separates; deploy stabilizing drogue chute
|- style="vertical-align:top;"
|  style="text-align:center; "| 2005 January 14, 09:49
|  style="text-align:left; "|Huygens activates its surface proximity sensor, allowing it to measure its altitude and spin rate. 
|- style="vertical-align:top;"
|  style="text-align:center; " | 2005 January 14, 09:57
|  style="text-align:left; " | The Gas Chromatograph Mass Spectrometer, the last instrument to be activated, begins to sample the atmosphere.
|- style="vertical-align:top;"
|  style="text-align:center; vertical-align:top;" | 2005 January 14, 11:12
|  style="text-align:left; vertical-align:top;" |Cassini makes its closest flyby of Titan (Titan-C) at an altitude of 59,996 kilometers at a speed of 5,401 meters per second and 93 degree phase angle (azimuth = 278 degrees, elevation = 33 degrees as seen from the landing site)
|- style="vertical-align:top;"
|  style="text-align:center; " | 2005 January 14, 11:30
|  style="text-align:left; " |Huygens turns on its descent imager lamp.
|- style="vertical-align:top;"
|  style="text-align:center; " | 2005 January 14, 11:37
|  style="text-align:left; " |Huygens lands on the surface of Titan
|- style="vertical-align:top;"
|  style="text-align:center; " | 2005 January 14, 13:11
|  style="text-align:left; " |Cassini sets in the west (azimuth = 272 degrees) as seen from the landing site
|- style="vertical-align:top;"
|  style="text-align:center; " | 2005 January 14, 13:47
|  style="text-align:left; " |Cassini stops probe data collection
|- style="vertical-align:top;"
|  style="text-align:center; " | 2005 January 14, 18:14
|  style="text-align:left; "| Cassini sends the first of Huygens''' data back to Earth.
|}

Fly-bys
Following is a list of close fly-bys of Saturn's moons (at less than 5000 km). The closest approach for each moon is bolded.

Primary mission

Extended (Equinox) mission

Solstice mission
The second extended mission was scheduled from 2010 October 12 through the Saturnian summer solstice in May 2017, followed by two dozen proximal orbits of Saturn and the rings. Cassinis final optical navigation image of the mission was taken on 20 September 2016. The Cassini'' mission ended on 15 September 2017, when the craft disintegrated in Saturn's atmosphere.

Proximal orbits

References

External links
 Cassini–Huygens press release archives
 "Cassini–Huygens Saturn Arrival" June 2004 (pdf)
 Draft White paper for Solar System Decadal Survey 2013–2023: Cassini–Huygens Solstice Mission 2009 (pdf)
 Tour dates

Spaceflight timelines